St Andrew's Street or St Andrew Street may refer to:

 St Andrew's Street, Cambridge, England
 St Andrew's Street, Droitwich Spa, England
 St Andrew's Street, Newcastle upon Tyne, England
 St Andrew Street, Dunedin, New Zealand

Odonyms referring to religion